Charles Mergendahl (February 23, 1919 – April 27, 1959) was an American writer, best known for his salacious 1958 novel The Bramble Bush (1958) and its 1960 film adaptation. He also contributed original scripts and adaptations to various American television anthology series throughout the 1950s.

Biography

Early life and career
Charles H. Mergendahl, Jr. was born in 1919 in Lynn, Massachusetts, the first of five children born to Charles Henry Mergendahl and Alice Brockway—the former a math instructor at Classical High School, the latter an English teacher at Worcester High School of Commerce. Charles Jr. attended Newton High School and Phillips Exeter Academy, graduating in 1937. He received his B.A. from Bowdoin College, graduating in 1941, and his M.A. from Boston University.

Throughout high school and college, Mergendahl had been involved in theater; in 1941, his play, My Last Duchess (a blank-verse dramatization of Robert Browning's much-anthologized poem), was awarded 1st prize in Bowdoin College's annual one-act play competition and his next play prompted the Boston Globe to write:
Mr. Mergendahl shows promise. He has a clever manner of writing lines that bring out what is really inside of his characters. He also has the ability to create a tense situations and to draw characters in contrast. Less commendable, however, is his way of looking at the world as though everyone in it is in the wrong profession and unhappy. 
Although an extended tour of duty in World War II necessarily brought his direct participation in theatre to an end, it does not appear to have adversely affected Mergendahl's productivity. In 1945, United Press reported that "during eight major engagements," Mergendahl had, by his own account, "written four novels, eight plays, and thirty short stories." 

He was awarded a Bronze Star decoration for his military service in leading the first wave of Marines onto the beach during the Battle of Tarawa in the Pacific War.

During the filming of his most famous novel, which was being reprinted to coincide with the release, Mergendahl died of brain trauma following an accidental fall at his home. He was only 40 years old; leaving behind a teenage daughter whose mother (his wife) had predeceased him.

Works

Drama
 The Twig (1940)
 My Last Duchess (1941)
 Me and Harry (1941)
 Watch for the Morning (1941)Christmas FantasyPark BenchStanding Room Only

Fiction

Novels
 Don't Wait Up for Spring (1944)
 His Days are as Grass (1946)
 This Spring of Love (1948)
 It's Only Temporary (1951)
 With Kisses Four (1954)
 The Bramble Bush (novel, 1958)
 The Lonely Ones—aka The Girl Cage—and Tiger by the Tail (1959, both published posthumously)

Filmography

Television
 Kraft Theatre"The Picture Window" (1954)"Split Level" (1954)
 Ponds Theater"See You on Sunday" (1954)"The Rugged Mountains" (1955)
 The Pepsi-Cola Playhouse"I'll Be Waiting" (story, 1955)
 Matinee Theatre"See You on Sunday" (1955)"Herself Alone" (1956)
 Star Tonight"Three Hours Between Planes" (adaptation, 1956)
 The Man Called X"Forged Documents" (story, 1957)

Film
 The Bramble Bush (novel, 1960)

References

Further reading

Articles
 Hillyer, Dorothy (October 4, 1944). "Over the Fence". The Boston Globe.
 "'This Is Your FBI' Dramatizes Cases From FBI Files; Charles Mergendahl Story Dramatized". The Jackson Sun. April 5, 1945. p. 16.
 Mergendahl, Charles (April 7, 1945). "One Was Disloyal". The Saturday Evening Post. pp. 16, 105–106, 108. 
 Mergendahl, Charles (July 15, 1945). "Well, Good Night". MacLean's Magazine. pp. 13, 28–30.
 Mergendahl, Charles (September 1945). "The Best I Ever Had". Adventure. pp. 82–89, 143.
 Mergendahl, Charles (November 1945). "Thanksgiving". Hearst's International combined with Cosmopolitan. pp. 10–11.
 Mergendahl, Charles (May 1946). "The Marvelous Adventure of Sidney J. Nealy".  Hearst's International combined with Cosmopolitan. pp. 36–37, 143–148; also p. 17 (brief explanation of the image created by artist Austin Briggs and photographer Ralph Steiner, which is seen on pp. 36–37).
 Mergendahl, Charles (June 1953). "Mrs. Morrison's Kiss". Cosmopolitan. pp. 65–69. 
 "Cop Dies Trying to Save Motorist". Pittsburgh Post-Gazette. April 21, 1959. p. 7.
 "Deaths and Funerals". The Boston Globe. April 30, 1959. p. 28.
 Obituary: Charles Mergendahl". Andean Air Mail & Peruvian Times. May 1959. p. 17.

Books
 "Secret Recipe"; Hubin, Allen, ed. (1971). Best of the Best Detective Stories, 25th Anniversary Collection. New York: E.P. Dutton and Company. pp. 203–211. .
 "Do It Yourself"; Lore, Elana, ed. (1983). Alfred Hitchcock's A Choice of Evils. New York: The Dial Press. pp.87–92. .

External links

1919 births
1959 deaths
20th-century American male writers
20th-century American novelists
20th-century American screenwriters
20th-century American short story writers
Accidental deaths from falls
American male novelists
American male screenwriters
American male short story writers
American sailors
American war novelists
Military personnel from New York (state)
Novelists from Massachusetts
Novelists from New York (state)
People from Glen Cove, New York
People from Lynn, Massachusetts
People from Newton, Massachusetts
Screenwriters from Massachusetts
Screenwriters from New York (state)
Harvard University alumni
Phillips Exeter Academy alumni
United Church of Christ members
United States Navy personnel of World War II